Thomas A. DuBois is a folklorist, scholar of Sámi culture, professor, and the chair of the Department of German, Nordic, and Slavic+ at the University of Wisconsin–Madison.

Personal life
DuBois is married to Wendy Vardaman, a former Poet Laureate of Madison, Wisconsin.

Career
Thomas A. DuBois received his Ph.D. in folklore and folklife from the University of Pennsylvania in 1990. He taught at the University of Washington from 1990-1999. While there, he founded the Finnish Studies Program in the Department of Scandinavian Studies and helped initiate the department's Baltic Studies program. In 2000, DuBois moved to the University of Wisconsin-Madison. He is a professor in the Scandinavian Studies Department, as well as the Department of Comparative Literature and Folklore Studies. DuBois has also served as the Director of the Religious Studies Program. 
His research interests include folklore and identity in the Nordic region, particularly in connection with Finnish, Sámi, and Swedish cultures. DuBois also researches the Baltic region and the broader cultural context of Northern Europe, as well as Celtic-Scandinavian cultural relations. DuBois has written, edited, or co-edited many books and has published articles in journals such as Journal of American Folklore, Journal of Finnish Studies, Scandinavian Studies, and Oral Tradition.

In 2013 and 2014, DuBois served as president of the Society for the Advancement of Scandinavian Study.

He is the editor of the Folklore of the Nordic-Baltic Region series, published by the Welsh Academic Press. Together with James P. Leary, he served as co-editor of the Journal of American Folklore. from 2011 to 2015.

DuBois has also translated into English Johan Turi's "An Account of the Sámi", the first secular book ever written in the Sámi language. The translation was published in 2011.

DuBois worked as a consultant for Disney on Frozen II.

Awards
In 2011, DuBois was awarded an honorary doctorate from the University of Umeå in Umeå, Sweden.
In 2012, he won a Kellet Award from the University of Wisconsin-Madison.
In 2016, he was inducted as a foreign member of the Finnish Academy of Science and Letters

Works

 (co-authored with Leea Virtanen)

 (ed.)

 (ed. with Susan Brantly)
 (trans.)

Films
 Wiigwaasi-Jiimaan: These Canoes Carry Culture
 Birchbark Canoes and Wild Rice

References

American folklorists
Academic journal editors
Scandinavian studies scholars
University of Wisconsin–Madison faculty
Society for the Advancement of Scandinavian Study
Year of birth missing (living people)
Living people
Place of birth missing (living people)